Kahriz-e Olya may refer to:
 Kahriz-e Olya, Harsin, Kermanshah Province